Curtis Deboy is an Australian rules football umpire currently officiating in the Australian Football League.

He first umpired in the Central District Junior Football League in 2004. He made his umpiring debut in the South Australian National Football League in 2009 at the age of 19 and went on to umpire 119 SANFL games, including the 2012, 2013 and 2014 Grand Finals. He was on the AFL umpiring rookie list for 2013 and 2014, officiating his first game, substituted on as an emergency umpire, in 2014. In 2015, he was added to the senior umpiring list, and made his debut as a non-emergency umpire in Round 4 of that year, in a match between the Western Bulldogs and Adelaide at Docklands Stadium.

He is one of the fastest umpires in the AFL, leading the Umpire 3 km time trial in 2015.

Personal life

Deboy was born in Adelaide, South Australia and attended Eynesbury Senior College. He is married and resides in Melbourne, Australia.

References

Living people
Australian Football League umpires
1990 births